John Enright (July 2, 1864 – February 19, 1898) was a United States Navy sailor and a recipient of the United States military's highest decoration, the Medal of Honor.

Biography
Born on July 2, 1864, in Lynn, Massachusetts, Enright joined the Navy from that state. On that day, while Ranger was off the coast of Ensenada, Mexico, he jumped overboard and rescued two fellow sailors, Ordinary Seamen John Bell and George Svensson, from drowning. For this action, he was awarded the Medal of Honor.

Enright's official Medal of Honor citation reads:
On board the U.S.S. Ranger off Ensenada, Mexico, 18 January 1886. Jumping overboard from that vessel, Enright rescued John Bell, ordinary seaman, and George Svensson, ordinary seaman, from drowning.

Enright was honorably discharged from the Navy on May 21, 1889. He died at age 33 on February 19, 1898, and was buried at sea. A marker in his memory was placed at Phoenix Memorial Park in Phoenix, Arizona.

See also

List of Medal of Honor recipients during peacetime

References

1864 births
1898 deaths
People from Lynn, Massachusetts
United States Navy sailors
United States Navy Medal of Honor recipients
Burials at sea
Non-combat recipients of the Medal of Honor